Sebakwe Dam is a dam in the Midlands Province of Zimbabwe. It was built in 1957 and owned by the Zimbabwe government. It is across Sebakwe River in the Sanyati Catchment Area. 

It has a full capacity of 266 megalitres which makes it one of the largest inland dams of Zimbabwe. It is 8 kilometres long and its maximum width is 2.5 kilometres; 
The surface area is 2320 hectares; Its wall is 47 m high and 3 km long.

Background
It was built as a small dam in 1957 and was raised 1986. 
 

In 1957 Sebakwe Dam was the second largest dam in Southern Rhodesia. Its height then was 154 feet high (47 meters). covering an area of 9 square miles (2320 ha) with a capacity of 35 billion imperial gallons.

Operations
It supplies water to Kwekwe and Redcliff, and for irrigation.

See also
•Sebakwe River
 Globe and Phoenix Mine
 Gaika Mine
 Kwekwe

References

Dams in Zimbabwe
Dams completed in 1957
1957 establishments in Southern Rhodesia